Vidali is a surname. Notable people with the surname include:

Lynn Vidali (born 1952), American swimmer
Vittorio Vidali (1900–1983), Italian communist and Soviet Spy

See also
Vidale